The Akwa Ibom State Ministry of Agricultural Resources is the state government ministry, charged with the responsibility to plan, devise and implement the state policies on Agricultural Resources.

References 

Government ministries of Akwa Ibom State
Akwa Ibom